Living Together is a 1973 play by British playwright Alan Ayckbourn. It is one of the plays in The Norman Conquests trilogy, which together form one of Ayckbourn's most popular works.

The trilogy covers a traumatic family weekend in a Victorian country house from the vantage point of three different areas: dining room, living room and garden. Living Together covers the action that takes place in the living room.

External links
 The Norman Conquests on Ayckbourn's official website

References

Plays by Alan Ayckbourn
1973 plays